Fontidessus is a genus of predaceous diving beetles in the family Dytiscidae. There are about seven described species in Fontidessus. They are found in the Neotropics.

Species
These seven species belong to the genus Fontidessus:
 Fontidessus aquarupe K.B. Miller & Montano, 2014
 Fontidessus bettae K.B. Miller & Montano, 2014
 Fontidessus christineae K.B. Miller & Montano, 2014
 Fontidessus microphthalmus K.B. Miller & Montano, 2014
 Fontidessus ornatus K.B. Miller, 2008
 Fontidessus toboganensis K.B. Miller & Spangler, 2008
 Fontidessus wheeleri K.B. Miller, 2008

References

Further reading

 
 
 

Dytiscidae